Asthenotricha flavicoma is a moth in the family Geometridae first described by William Warren in 1899. It is found in the Democratic Republic of the Congo, Cameroon, Uganda and Kenya.

References

Moths described in 1899
Asthenotricha
Moths of Africa